"Black Butterfly" is a song written by the song-writing duo Barry Mann and Cynthia Weil in 1982, and most famously recorded by American recording artist Deniece Williams. The Williams recording was released in 1984 for Columbia Records and is on her 1984 album Let's Hear it for the Boy. The B-side of her single is a song called "Blind Dating", another album feature.

The single peaked at number 22 on the Billboard Hot Soul Songs chart.

Overview
"Black Butterfly" was produced by George Duke and composed by Barry Mann with Cynthia Weil.
The single's b-side was a song called "Blind Dating". Both tunes came from Deniece Williams' 1984 studio album Let's Hear It For The Boy.

Covers
"Black Butterfly" has been covered by Patti LaBelle on the 2004 soundtrack to Johnson Family Vacation, Tamia on her 2015 album Love Life and Will Downing on his 2016 album Black Pearls.

Personnel 
Michael Sembello – electric guitar
Ricky Lawson – drums
Nathan East –  bass guitar
Russell Ferrante – Rhodes electric piano, piano
Richard Elliot – Lyricon
George Merrill, Roosevelt Christmas, Shannon Rubicam – background vocals
George Duke – Prophet 5 keyboards

Production
Mitch Gibson  – engineer, recorded by

Chart performance

References 

1984 singles
Deniece Williams songs
Songs written by Barry Mann
1984 songs
Columbia Records singles
Songs with lyrics by Cynthia Weil